Norske Hits is a compilation album of recordings by Boney M. released by BMG-Ariola in Norway in late 1998.

The compilation includes Boney M.'s greatest hits from a Norwegian perspective: singles "Daddy Cool"/"No Woman No Cry" (#1, 1976), "Sunny" (#4, 1977), "Ma Baker" (#1 1977), "Rivers Of Babylon"/"Brown Girl In The Ring" (#1, 1978), "Rasputin" (#10, 1978), "Hooray! Hooray! It's A Holiday" (#2, 1979), "Gotta Go Home"/"El Lute" (#4, 1979), "My Friend Jack" (#6, 1980), "The Summer Megamix" (#3, 1989) as well as 1984's "Kalimba de Luna" and selected tracks from their best-selling albums Take The Heat Off Me (#2, 1977), Love For Sale (#2, 1977), Nightflight to Venus (#1, 1978) and Oceans Of Fantasy (#1, 1979).

Norske Hits spent 12 weeks on the Norwegian charts in late 1998 and early 1999, peaking at #17.

Track listing
"Daddy Cool" (Farian, Reyam)  - 3:26
1992 overdub version from Gold - 20 Super Hits
"Ma Baker" (Farian, Jay, Reyam)  - 4:07
1992 overdub edit from Gold - 20 Super Hits 
"Rivers of Babylon"  (Farian, Reyam) - 4:15
1992 overdub version from Gold - 20 Super Hits 
"Brown Girl in the Ring" (Farian) - 4:00
 Remix '93, radio edit
"Hooray! Hooray! It's a Holi-Holiday " (Farian, Jay)  - 3:55
1992 overdub version from Gold - 20 Super Hits. Original 7" mix is released on "Kalimba de luna" 2007 CD album.
"The Summer Mega Mix" (Bobby Hebb, Farian, Jay, Reyam, Klinkhammer, Amoruso, Esposito, Licastro, Malavasi) - 4:28
 Radio edit. ("Sunny" / "Ma Baker" / "Gotta Go Home" / "Kalimba De Luna" / "Hooray! Hooray! It's A Holi-Holiday" / "Summer A GoGo")
"Sunny" (Bobby Hebb) - 3:56
1992 overdub version from Gold - 20 Super Hits
"El Lute" (Blum, Farian, Jay)  - 4:00 
 1989 remix from Greatest Hits Of All Times - Remix '89 - Volume II, edited
"Gotta Go Home" (Farian, Huth, Jay)  -  2:30
1992 overdub edit from Gold - 20 Super Hits. Original 7" mix ( - 4:40) released on the "Let it all be music- the party album" 2009 double CD.
"My Friend Jack" (The Smoke) - 4:28
 Original album version from The Magic Of Boney M. - 20 Golden Hits  
"Rasputin"  (Farian, Jay, Reyam) - 4:26
1992 overdub edit from Gold - 20 Super Hits. Original 7" mix ( - 4:43) released on "The Collection" 2008 triple CD.
"Nightflight to Venus" (Frank Farian, Fred Jay, Kawohl)  - 3:50
 1992 edit from Gold - 20 Super Hits
"Painter Man" (Phillips, Pickett) - 3:10 
 1992 overdub version from Gold - 20 Super Hits
"Bahama Mama" (Farian, Jay) - 3:13
 1993 overdub edit from More Gold - 20 Super Hits Vol. II
"The Calendar Song (January, February, March...)"  (Farian) - 3:25
 1993 remix from More Gold - 20 Super Hits Vol. II  
"No Woman, No Cry"  (Bob Marley)  - 4:20
1992 overdub edit from Gold - 20 Super Hits
"Belfast" (Billybury, Deutscher, Menke)  - 3:25
1992 overdub version from Gold - 20 Super Hits
"Fever" (Eddie Cooley, John Davenport) - 4:00 
 Original album version
"Kalimba de Luna" (Amoruso, DiFranco, Esposito, Licastro, Malavas) - 4:13
 1992 overdub version from Gold - 20 Super Hits

Personnel
 Liz Mitchell - lead vocals, backing vocals
 Marcia Barrett - lead vocals, backing vocals
 Frank Farian - lead vocals, backing vocals
 Reggie Tsiboe - lead vocals, backing vocals

Production
 Frank Farian - producer, remixer

Sources and external links
 Rate Your Music, detailed discography
 Discogs.com, detailed discography
 [ Allmusic, biography, discography etc.]

Albums produced by Frank Farian
1998 compilation albums
Boney M. compilation albums